Broca may refer to:

 340479 Broca, a minor planet
 Broca's area, a region of the hominid brain with functions linked to speech production
 Broca's Brain, a book by Carl Sagan
 Hôpital Broca, a Paris hospital

People with the surname
 Cesar Velasco Broca (born 1978), a Spanish cult filmmaker
 José Brocá (1805–1882), Spanish composer
 Lilian Broca (born 1946), a Romanian-Canadian artist and art educator
 Paul Broca (1824–1880), French physician, anatomist, and anthropologist
 Philippe de Broca (1933–2004), a French movie director

See also